Alice of Wonderland in Paris or Alice in a New Wonderland is a 1966 Czech-American animated film directed by Gene Deitch and produced by William L. Snyder in extreme limited animation.

Plot
Young Alice, having become a celebrity for her adventures in Wonderland, is in her bedroom dreaming about visiting Paris and sharing adventures with the storybook girl Madeline. While no comment is made as to where this Alice comes from or what time the film is set in, Alice seems to be American, as she likes cheeseburgers and is having a great deal of trouble when it comes to getting to France. As Alice points out, “Getting to Wonderland was easy – all I had to do was fall down the rabbit hole. But let’s face it – it takes money to get to Paris!”.

As Alice dreams in her bedroom, a talking mouse named François rides a bicycle into Alice's bedroom and wants to conduct a survey about her favourite cheeses.  Alice wants to join François in his native Paris, so François uses a cheese that his company makes, which uses the same magical mushroom she ate in Wonderland as an ingredient, to shrink Alice to rodent size.  Together, they ride through Paris, where François narrates a series of short stories with a Parisian theme.

The film includes brief adaptations of five short stories:
 
Eve Titus' Anatole
Ludwig Bemelmans' Madeline and the Bad Hat 
Crockett Johnson's The Frowning Prince 
James Thurber's Many Moons
Ludwig Bemelmans' Madeline and the Gypsies.

In the end, when Alice finally meets her, it turns out that Madeline dreams of being Alice in Wonderland.

Cast
Norma MacMillan as Alice
Luce Ennis as Singer
Howard Morris as Grand Wizard, King (The Frowning Prince), Queen, The Frowning Prince
Carl Reiner as Anatole, Doucette, M. Duval
Trinka Snyder as Princess Lenore
Allen Swift as François, Narrator, King (Many Moons), Lord High Chamberlain
Lionel Wilson as Jester, Royal Mathematician, Royal Wizard, Minstrel

Production

Alice of Wonderland in Paris was created by the team of Gene Deitch and William L. Snyder, who had previously collaborated on Munro, which won the Academy Award for Animated Short Film in 1961. The filmmakers (along with Rembrandt Films) were also responsible for producing the 1960–1962 Tom and Jerry theatrical cartoons for Metro-Goldwyn-Mayer and also were one of the producers of the Popeye animated TV series for King Features Syndicate, aired on ABC between 1960 and 1963.

Attracted to the economy and beauty of Prague, Deitch and Snyder produced cartoons for both cinema release and cartoons based on short stories for school educational film use. Five of these stories were placed in the feature with new Alice sequences to be released as a feature film in the West.

Actors Carl Reiner, Howard Morris and Allen Swift provided the voice performances, and Canadian actress Norma MacMillan provided the voice of Alice.

Alice of Wonderland in Paris runs 52 minutes, which is somewhat short for a feature film release, and it was presented for its 1966 U.S. theatrical distribution on a bill with the short film White Mane. It was originally distributed in the U.S. theaters by a company called Childhood Productions; Paramount Pictures re-released it in 1975 as Alice in a New Wonderland, and White Mane was also part of the bill.

References

External links
 
 

1966 films
1966 animated films
1960s American animated films
1960s fantasy films
Czech animated films
Animated films based on Alice in Wonderland
Films directed by Gene Deitch
Films set in Paris
American anthology films
Films based on short fiction
Films about size change
American children's animated fantasy films
Madeline
Rembrandt Films films
Animated crossover films
English-language Czech films
1960s English-language films
Animated anthology films